San Juan de Payara is a city in Apure State in Venezuela. It is the shire town of the Pedro Camejo Municipality.

Cities in Apure
Populated places established in 1768
1768 establishments in the Spanish Empire